Harry Hunt (born 3 September 1988) is a British endurance and rally driver, and son of billionaire Jon Hunt. In 2016 he became the youngest British driver to take part in the Dakar Rally, finishing in 10th place out of 110 cars. He has participated in the Intercontinental Rally Challenge (IRC), winning the IRC 2WD class championship in 2010 and 2012.

Early career 
Hunt was first exposed to motorsports when his parents bought him a 50cc motorbike at the age of five, but because his feet could not reach the ground, he used a quad bike instead. He progressed to racing motocross bikes on the beach at Weston-super-Mare, which in turn led to "the natural progression to cars, driving off-road, then rally driving."

Rally career 
In 2007, aged 19, Hunt bought a pre-owned two-wheel-drive Ford Fiesta ST rally car and began to compete in junior and national competitions.

2009-2010
In 2009 Hunt took part in the Malcolm Wilson Rally, as well as his first international rally, the Rallye San Remo in Italy. In 2010 Hunt won the JWRC Rookie Cup and won 1st place in the Intercontinental Rally Challenge two wheel drive (IRC 2WD) Championship.

2011–2012
Hunt won the 2011 Production Rally Championship in a Citroen DS3 R3T. In 2012 he became the IRC 2WD Champion for a second time, and then won the European Rally Championship in the Citroen, before taking a break from rallying.

2015
In April 2015, Hunt participated in the Abu Dhabi Desert Challenge, finishing third and beating several more experienced drivers, despite completing less than 40 kilometres of testing in the desert beforehand.

In May, Hunt was appointed as the brand Ambassador for MINI in preparation for Dakar 2016. In June, he debuted the Mini ALL4 racing car at the Goodwood Festival of Speed.

In July, Hunt placed 13th at the Baja Aragon rally in Spain. The event was round six of the FIA (Federation International De L’automobile) World Cup for Cross-Country Rallies and provided similar terrain to his ultimate goal in 2016, the Dakar Rally.

In October, Hunt finished in 7th place at the Rallye Oilibya du Maroc, in Morocco. A total of 84 cars took part, with only two Dakar rookies in the final top 10, both of whom were driving a MINI - one being Hunt and the other Hunt’s team-mate Mikko Hirvonen, winner of 15 world championship rallies. Hunt finished two places behind Hirvonen. During the event Hunt stopped to help fellow cross country rookie Sebastien Loeb, whose car had caught fire. Hunt later said of the incident: "I don’t think he’d actually noticed, but luckily we were able to use the sentinel warning system to let him know that something was wrong."

Dakar Rally

Dakar Rally 2016

At the age of 27, Hunt was the youngest British rally driver to complete the Dakar Rally in 2016, finishing in 10th place at his first attempt, out of a field of 110 cars. He also became the youngest British rally driver to complete the Dakar.

Hunt competed as part of the X Raid Mini ALL4 Racing Team, running against more experienced drivers and finishing one place behind Sebastien Loeb, the most successful WRC driver in history. Hunt said:  "We drove at a good pace in all of the stages - not too quick, not too slow - and we managed to steer clear of any major problems...[the car] was amazing and withstood endless difficult terrain and my co-driver, Andy Schulz, was fantastic." (Schulz is the German driver who won the Dakar twice, with Jutta Kleinschmidt in 2001 and Hiroshi Masuoka in 2003).

Hunt calculated that he burnt over 66,000 calories while taking part. The two-week rally is considered to be one of motorsports toughest events, taking place over 10,000 km across sand dunes, salt flats, gravel roads, deep mud and rocks, in temperatures as high as 50 °C and at altitudes of up to 4,750 metres. As part of his race preparation Hunt trained in the Heat Chamber at St Mary's University, Twickenham.

Talking about the psychological impact of the event, Hunt said: "You're completely alone. You get a real sense [of that] when you come over some of the sand dunes and you look out and there's just no one for hundreds of miles. It's an adventure."

Dakar 2017 plans 
Hunt now plans to focus on the Dakar Series, including another attempt at the Dakar in 2017. He is due to take part in the Abu Dhabi Desert Challenge and Rallye Oilibya du Maroc again and "potentially in the summer the Silk Way Rally, which is Moscow to Beijing."

After taking part in the Dakar in the Mini All4 Racing team X-Raid, Hunt will be switching to the Peugeot 2008 DKR that took victory in 2016.

Relationship with manufacturers

Mini
Hunt’s Dakar Mini ALL4 X-Raid is based on the Mini Countryman, but with four wheel drive and a 320 brake horsepower, three litre diesel engine delivering 700Nm of torque. Hunt describes it as "the best car to do Dakar in." The car cost £1 million and was built by the X-Raid factory in Germany. X-Raid is owned by the Quandt family, shareholders in Mini parent company BMW.

The car’s livery is a Union Flag design. Hunt was filmed driving the car on public roads in London in the build-up to his appearance at Goodwood. Hunt’s road car is also a MINI Countryman.

Dakar Rally results

Complete rally results

WRC results

IRC results

ERC results

PWRC results

JWRC results

Early career

Germany DRM

Ireland Tarmac

GB Rallies

BTRDA Forest Rally

References 

English rally drivers
Intercontinental Rally Challenge drivers
Dakar Rally drivers
European Rally Championship drivers
1988 births
Living people